The Bangor Civic Center was a convention center located in Bangor, Maine. It contained  of exhibit and meeting space, enough for 9 meetings at the same time. In addition to meetings, it could also host trade shows, wedding receptions, and banquets.

It could seat up to 1,200 in the main hall. An adjacent lecture room could hold up to 200 people, while the mezzanine could hold 150 people.

The Civic Center was part of the same complex as the Bangor Auditorium.

The two buildings began to be demolished on June 3, 2013, as they were replaced by the newly built Cross Insurance Center.

External links
 Demolition begins at Bangor Auditorium
 Bangor Civic Center homepage

Convention centers in Maine
Buildings and structures in Bangor, Maine
Tourist attractions in Bangor, Maine
2013 disestablishments in Maine